Pasquale Liotta Cristaldi (1850-1909) was an Italian painter.

Biography
He was born and resided in Catania. He trained in Naples under Domenico Morelli. He painted historical, genre, and landscape paintings. Among the historical paintings, was one on the subject of Congiura degli esuli siciliani in Rome (Conspiracy of the Sicilian exiles in Rome), against Charles V, which he exhibited in Naples in 1877. At Turin he exhibited a painting Artista in erba. At Milan, in 1881, he exhibited a Studio dal vero (Study from nature), and at Rome, in 1883, L'abbandonata (The Abandoned). At the 1884 Mostra di Turin he exhibited Vendetta; at 1887 in Venice, he exhibited a Quartetto. He also painted Nightmare of Elizabeth I featuring a beheaded Mary Stuart. He was a colleague and friend of Calcedonio Reina.

References

1850 births
1923 deaths
Artists from Catania
19th-century Italian painters
19th-century Italian male artists
Italian male painters
20th-century Italian painters
20th-century Italian male artists
Painters from Naples